The East Andean antbird (Drymophila caudata) is a species of bird in the family Thamnophilidae.
It is found at high levels in humid highland forests, especially near bamboo, and is endemic to the western slope of the Eastern Andes and the Upper Magdalena Valley in Caquetá and Huila in Colombia. This  bird is found at high elevations of about 1,500-2,500 m. It was formerly considered conspecific with the Klages's antbird, the Santa Marta antbird, and the streak-headed antbird and together called the long-tailed antbird.

The East Andean antbird was described by the English zoologist Philip Sclater in 1855 and given the binomial name Formicivora caudata.

References

External links

East Andean antbird
Birds of the Colombian Andes
Endemic birds of Colombia
East Andean antbird
East Andean antbird
Taxonomy articles created by Polbot